The 2012 season of the National League was the third tier/division of British speedway and was contested by eight teams.

Summary 
Newport and Belle Vue did not return from 2011, and Hackney opted to run at Rye House only, renaming the team Rye House Raiders.

Mildenhall Fen Tigers beat Dudley Heathens in the play-off final to become champions.

Final table 
 PL = Matches; W = Wins; D = Draws; L = Losses; Pts = Total Points

SCORING SYSTEM
Home loss by any number of points = 0
Home draw = 1
Home win by between 1 and 6 points = 2
Home win by 7 points or more = 3
Away loss by 7 points or more = 0
Away loss by 6 points or less = 1
Away draw = 2
Away win by between 1 and 6 points = 3
Away win by 7 points or more = 4

Play Offs 
Top four teams race off in two-legged semi-finals and final to decide championship. Mildenhall Fen Tigers defeated Dudley Heathens in the final.

Semi-finals

Final

Final Leading averages

National League Knockout Cup 
The 2012 National League Knockout Cup was the 15th edition of the Knockout Cup for tier three teams. Mildenhall Fen Tigers were the winners for the second successive year.

First round

Semi-finals

Final 

+abandoned heat 12 due to curfew result stands

Teams and averages

Buxton Hitmen
Charles Wright 8.53
Robert Branford 7.54
Adam McKinna 6.74
Dean Felton 5.77
Luke Priest 5.67
Ryan Blacklock 3.51
Chris Widman 3.49

Dudley Heathens
Adam Roynon 11.64
Tom Perry 9.88
Ashley Morris 8.51
Byron Bekker 7.44
Dan Greenwood 5.90
Darryl Ritchings 5.84
James White-Williams 4.88

Isle of Wight Islanders
Danny Warwick 7.01
Ben Hopwood 6.16
Paul Starke 5.70
Mark Baseby 5.67
Steve Jones 5.33
Danny Stoneman 3.83
Ross Walter 3.00
Adam Ellis 3.00

King's Lynn Young Stars
Darren Mallet 7.48
Lewis Kerr 6.67
Jake Knight 5.93
Adam Lowe 5.62
Brendan Johnson 5.25
Tom Stokes 5.12
Scott Campos 4.54
Lewis Rose 3.00

Mildenhall Fen Tigers
Cameron Heeps 9.18
Stefan Nielsen 8.32
Joe Jacobs 7.94
Lewis Blackbird 7.01
Danny Halsey 6.57
Josh Bates 5.30
Ryan Terry-Daley 3.00
Joe Graver 3.00

Rye House Raiders
Jason Garrity 9.42
James Sarjeant 7.87
Ben Morley 7.82
Luke Chessell 4.59
Shane Hazelden 4.57
Connor Coles 4.30
Brad Tokley 3.00

Scunthorpe Saints
Jerran Hart 9.04
Steve Worrall 8.36
Gary Irving 8.17
Tom Young 7.04
Oliver Greenwood 6.57
Max Clegg 4.54
Danny Phillips 3.00
Tommy Fenwick 3.00

Stoke Potters
Ashley Birks 9.66
Tony Atkin 7.75
Ben Reade 7.70
James Cockle 6.24
Liam Carr 3.61
Richard Andrews 3.41
Liam Rumsey 3.00

Development Leagues

Midland Development League 

Milton Keynes won grand final 21–15

Anglian Development League

Northern Development League

See also 
List of United Kingdom Speedway League Champions

References

See also 

Speedway National League
Speedway National League
Speedway National League